The Woman for Joe is a 1955 British drama film directed by George More O'Ferrall and starring Diane Cilento, George Baker, Jimmy Karoubi and David Kossoff. The screenplay concerns the owner of a circus sideshow and his prize attraction (a midget), who become romantically involved with the same woman. The film was made at Pinewood Studios. The sets were designed by the art director Maurice Carter.

Plot
Midget George Wilson pulls strings to obtain a job in the circus for Mary, a Hungarian lady he's fallen madly in love with. Mary is happy to have the job, singing to the lions, but although she likes George, her feelings for circus owner Joe Harrop are stronger. The jealousy and tensions caused affect the running of the circus.

Cast

Critical reception
TV Guide wrote, "the highlight of this picture is the elaborate circus set, but this does little to benefit the unfolding of the plot, which is predictable"; while AllMovie noted "an excellent showcase for leading lady Diane Cilento (later better known as Mrs. Sean Connery)... What could have been an exercise in tawdriness is redeemed by the colorful camerawork of Georges Perinal."

External links

References

1955 films
1955 drama films
Films shot at Pinewood Studios
British drama films
Films directed by George More O'Ferrall
Circus films
1950s English-language films
1950s British films